Na-Insaafi is a 1989 Bollywood film directed by Mehul Kumar and it stars
Shatrughan Sinha, Chunky Pandey, Mandakini, Sonam in lead roles.

Synopsis

Widowed Judge Kedarnath Sinha lives a happy life with 2 sons, CBI Inspector Vijay, and College-going Sonu. Vijay forgot, but is haunted by an incident in his youth that he can not clearly remember... In the past, on his fifth birthday party was interrupted by the crazed criminal Billa and his crew. Billa was sentenced by arrested by DCP Ravi Khanna and sentenced by Judge Kedarnath Sinha, for which he swore revenge. Billa fatally castrates DCP Ravi Khanna and then cuts off Kedarnath's hand. He then abducts and rapes Sharda Khanna, leaving her pregnant, something doctors have told her would be fatal...

In the present Vijay is effected by seeing glimpses of this and has flashbacks. Vijay actually  Vijay has vowed to one day bring Billa to justice and becomes a CBI officer. He has a little brother named Sonu. On his twenty fifth birthday, once Kedarnath tells him that he's Sharda's and Billa's son, Sonu is shocked by the revelation. Sonu accepts this reality and leaves the Sinha home.

Little do the two brothers from the same mother realize that Billa is now the white collared Daaga, whose is know to the people of India as a business man however it is all a cover as he is now a crime lord. Will the two brother bring down Daaga or go their own ways and clash?

Cast
Shatrughan Sinha as Vijay Sinha
Chunky Pandey as Sonu
Mandakini as Kamli
Sonam as Rita D'Souza
Sujit Kumar as DCP Ravi Saxena
Aruna Irani as Sharda Saxena
Kiran Kumar as Numbari Kaalia
Raza Murad as Shakaal
Gulshan Grover as Teja
Amrish Puri as Billa / Daaga
Om Shivpuri as Judge Kedarnath
Asrani as Khadak Singh
Mac Mohan as Gopal
Sudhir as John D'Souza

Soundtrack
Lyrics: Anjaan

External links

1980s Hindi-language films
1989 films
Films scored by Bappi Lahiri
Films directed by Mehul Kumar